The Eastern Regional Minister is the Ghana government official who is responsible for overseeing the administration of the Eastern Region of Ghana. The region is home to a large part of the Akan ethnic group. The region was initially headed by a Chief Executive but is now headed by a Regional Minister. The title has also changed during the periods when there was military rule. Since the December 2019 referendum, there are currently sixteen administrative regions in Ghana. The capital has always been at Koforidua.

List of Eastern Regional Ministers

See also

Ministers of the Ghanaian Government
Eastern Region

References

Politics of Ghana
Eastern Regional Minister